Abel Roberts Finch (31 August 1908 – 2000) was an footballer who played as a full-back.

He joined Hednesford Prims in 1922 and Hednesford Town in 1923, but after only a few first- team games he was approached by West Bromwich Albion, signing professional forms for them in 1925, making his debut at home to Leicester City, 27 February 1926, at the age of 17.

Bob made two England International trials, one of them for the Rest v England, opposite the great Dixie Dean. On 6 March 1937, he played against Arsenal in a 6th Round FA Cup game before 64,815 Hawthorn supporters.
Transferred to Swansea in May 1939, Bob managed only one game before War was declared.

Bob made 216 senior appearances for Albion and 231 more for their Central League side, many as captain, winning Championship medals in 1926–27, 32–33, 33-34 and 34–35, but was unlucky in being out of the Albion team for most of the 1930–31 season when they won promotion from Division Two and the FA Cup in the same season.

Bob died locally in 2000, aged 92.

References

1908 births
2000 deaths
People from Hednesford
English footballers
Association football fullbacks
Hednesford Town F.C. players
West Bromwich Albion F.C. players
Swansea City A.F.C. players
Tamworth F.C. players